Abnaa Al-Madina Sport Club, is an Iraqi football team based in Sadr City, Baghdad, that plays in Iraq Division Two.

Managerial history
  Khalaf Habash
  Salam Tuaima
  Saddam Al-Rubaie

See also 
 2021–22 Iraq Division Three 
 2022–23 Iraq Division Two

References

External links
 Iraq Clubs- Foundation Dates

Football clubs in Iraq
Association football clubs established in 2021
Football clubs in Baghdad